The Irish College of St Anthony, in Leuven, Belgium, known in ,  and ,  has been a centre of Irish learning on the European Continent since the early 17th century. The college was dedicated to St. Anthony of Padua.

History
The college was founded in 1607 by Florence Conry, Archbishop of Tuam, and Irish Franciscan Hugh MacCaghwell (Lecturer at the University of Salamanca, later Archbishop of Armagh), with the support of Philip III of Spain, as an exile institution for the training of Irish Franciscan priests. A bull of foundation was acquired from Pope Paul V on April 3rd, 1607. The foundation stone of the current building was laid in 1617. Funding came from Isabella Clara Eugenia, wife and co-ruler with Archduke Albert. It was one of the main centres of Irish learning and the preservation of Irish intellectual culture during penal times. The Irish language was used in the college, and Irish was read during meals. The monks preserved and translated many Irish language documents.

Following the Flight of the Earls a number of the O'Neill and O'Donnell clans stayed in Louvain, and a number are buried there.

College of the Immaculate Conception, Prague was founded in 1629 by Irish Franciscan priests from Louvain, including Patrick Fleming and Malachy Fallon (both Professors in Louvain). In 1787 following the suppression by the Habsburgs, of the College of the Immaculate Conception, Prague, students were transferred to Louvain.

The Pastoral Irish College, Louvain (Collège des Hibernois/Collegium pastorale Hibernorum) established in 1622, by the archbishop of Dublin Eugene Matthews (and sanctioned in 1624 by a papal charter and financially by Pope Urban VII), was under the supervision of the Franciscans, and affiliated to the University. It was based in Rue des Orphelins, Presidents/Rectors of the Irish Pastoral college Louvain include Nicholas Aylmer, John Sullivan (from Kerry who set up a bursary for louvain), Florence Sullivan and a Dr. Kent. The Pastoral College closed in 1795 following French occupation. Thomas Stapleton also served as Rector of the pastoral college as well as of the University of Louvain.

The Irish Dominican College, Louvain (Irish Dominican College of Holy Cross), founded in 1620's, priory built in 1650 and chapel in 1659, was also suppressed in 1795, the property sold and buildings destroyed in 1799-1800, the street name in La Rue des Dominicains Irlandais now in Flemish lerse Predikherenstraat (Irish Preachers' Street) is all that remains.

Re-establishment of the Irish College, Leuven
Closed down by the French invaders on January 8, 1797, the buildings were sold by public auction, later they were bought by the guardian Fr. James Gowan in 1822, since the university was closed he disposed of it in 1830 becoming a boys' school for the duration of the 19th century. In 1925 the Irish Franciscans again acquired the site (technically it was owned until 1973 by the Catholic University to issues of foreign organistion ownership), it needed repairs since it had been damaged during the great war, helped by Rev James J. Ryan and his friend from his University days Cardinal Désiré-Joseph Mercier, and helped by funding from Irish-born American philanthropist Marquis Martin Maloney. In 1927 the college reopened.

Following the German invasion in 1940, students were transferred to the Franciscan College in Galway, and the college was entrusted to Belgian friars, with the Irish province resuming control in 1948, using it for their own educational purposes until 1983. 

2007 saw a celebration of the 400th anniversary of the foundation of St Anthony's, the Irish Franciscan College, in Louvain, with events in Ireland and Leuven to commemorate it. A commemorative stamp was issued by the Irish post office to celebrate the 400th anniversary.

A project to provide online access to the Irish manuscripts of the Irish College in Leuven is a collaboration between the Center for Irish Studies (KU Leuven), KBR, the Irish Embassy in Belgium and Irish Script on Screen (Dublin Institute for Advanced Studies).

Irish College Leuven / Leuven Institute of Ireland in Europe 
The Franciscans leased the property to the Leuven Institute of Ireland in Europe which opened in 1984, as a secular academic institution. The Leuven Centre for Irish Studies (LCIS) launched in 2010, is a collaboration between the Institute and the Catholic University of Leuven, it is also the centre for the European Federation of Associations and Centres of Irish Studies (EFACIS). Part of the mission is to promote Irish Culture, and as a result, it hosts performances, concerts, recitals and exhibitions, one of the initiatives is the Writer in residence at the Irish College.

In 2014 two Irish students died in a fire at a college residence in the Leuven Institute for Ireland, for which the director and institute were found to be at fault.

KU Leuven, use some 42 rooms in the Irish College for International students.

St. Anthony's Parish - English Speaking Champaincy
In 1972 the Irish Franciscans began to minister to English speakers in the Kraainem parish in Brussels, following the accession of Ireland and the UK to the EEC, and a request from Cardinal Suenans to the Irish Franciscans, already present at the Irish College, who appointed Fr. Michael Bailey to a new English-speaking chaplaincy in 1973. The order purchased a house on Avenue l’Oiseau Bleu as the chaplains residence and parish centre, and in 1983 bought the present property which is now the St. Anthony's Parish. Edmund Dougan OFM, (former professor and guardian of the Irish College) served as Parish Priest at St. Anthonys from 1987 to 1995.

People associated with the College

Important works published by scholars associated with the College

Amongst the most notable Irish scholars associated with the college were, in alphabetical order: Bishop Dominic de Burgo (Burke), John Colgan, Aodh Mac Cathmhaoil (also known as Aodh Mac Aingil), Mícheál Ó Cléirigh, Giolla Brighde Ó hEódhasa (also known as Bonaventura Ó hEodhasa) and Flaithrí Ó Maol Chonaire.

Notable staff and alumni
The head of the College was the Guardian the equivalent of a college rector or president, with the Vicar being the effective deputy.
Francis De Burgo (Burke) served as Bishop of Kilmacduagh
Edmund Bourke OP, was regent of the Irish Dominican College in Louvain
Raymond Caron (also known as Raymond Redmond) O.M.R. (1605–1666), served as Professor in Louvain, he was a Recollect friar and author.
Denis Conway (1722–1796), Bishop of Limerick (1779-1796)
Malachy Fallon, Professor of Theology, helped set up the College of the Immaculate Conception in Prague in 1629.
Patrick Fleming, a former student, and professor in Louvain, helped set up the college in Prague in 1629.
Thomas Fleming Archbishop of Dublin.
Nicholas French (1604–1678)
Antony Hickey (1586–1641)
Walter Blake Kirwan (1754–1805) studied in Louvain, following ordination he held the chair of Moral and Natural Philosophy, he converted to Anglicanism becoming Dean of Killala and a noted preacher.
Aodh Buidhe Mac an Bhaird/Hugh Ward DD (c.1593–1635), first professor of divinity and later guardian(rector) of the college in Louvain, from 1626, established an Irish press in St. Anthony's.
Heber MacMahon, Bishop of Clogher
John Evangelist McBride OFM (1903-1991), Bishop of Kokstad, South Africa (1951-1978)
Donatus Mooney, the first guardian of the college
Wilfrid Napier OFM (1943- ), Cardinal, Archbishop of Durban (1992-2021)
Mícheál Ó Cléirigh (c.1590–1643)
Giolla Brighde Ó hEódhasa/Bonaventure O'Hussey MA(Douai), guardian died in office in 1614
John (O') Sullivan (1633-1699), rector of the University of Louvain (1690-1691), president of Irish Pastoral College (1672-1697), president of the College de Drieux, Louvain (1692-95).
Brendan Jennings OFM, first guardian following the reopening of the Irish College in 1927.
Edmund Dougan OFM, a former professor of sociology and Guardian (1957-63) of the Irish College, later serving as Parish Priest at St. Anthonys from 1987 to 1995.
James J. Ryan J.C.B. (Lovan.), studied at Louvain, served as President of St. Patrick's College, Thurles, supported and funded the re-purchasing of property in 1923 for the Irish college for its reopening in 1927.

Buried at the College
A number of people who are buried at the college include founder Archbishop Florence Conry, Bishop Dominic de Burgo and Dominic Lynch. Rosa O’Doherty, wife of Owen Roe O’Neill, is also buried on the College grounds, a number of the others of the exiled O'Neills and O'Donnells are buried here. Rev. Dr. Hugh Ward is also buried in the college.

See also
 Irish College
 List of colleges of Leuven University
 Sant’Isidoro a Capo le Case (Franciscan College in Rome)
 College of the Immaculate Conception, Prague (Franciscan College founded by priests from Leuven in Prague then Bohemia)
 Irish College in Paris now run similarly as the Irish Cultural Centre and Irish Chaplaincy in Paris

References

Irish diaspora in Europe
Old University of Leuven colleges
1607 establishments in the Habsburg Netherlands
1794 disestablishments in the Habsburg monarchy
1794 disestablishments in the Holy Roman Empire
Disestablishments in the Austrian Netherlands
Educational institutions established in the 1600s
1925 establishments in Belgium
1983 disestablishments in Belgium
KU Leuven
Protected heritage sites in Belgium
Irish Colleges on the Continent